(Untitled) is a 2009 American comedy film directed and written by Jonathan Parker, co-written by Catherine DiNapoli, and starring Adam Goldberg, Marley Shelton, Eion Bailey, and Vinnie Jones. The film was released on October 23, 2009 in the United States.

Plot 
Set in the artsy Chelsea, this satirical film centers on a young bohemian avant-garde composer Adrian, who becomes involved with a trendy New York art gallery owner, Madeleine. Adrian is a composer who makes music by breaking glass and kicking metal buckets. In contrast to Adrian is his brother Josh, a successful painter who happens to bring Madeline to one of his brother's concerts. Madeleine is immediately drawn to Adrian's work and invites him to perform at her gallery and into her bedroom. Eventually, Josh discovers the secret relationship between Madeleine and Adrian, and the fact that Madeleine has been using Josh's paintings, which have commercial appeal, to keep the gallery running while it features more avant-garde work.

Cast 
Adam Goldberg as Adrian Jacobs, a young bohemian composer
Marley Shelton as Madeleine Gray, a trendy New York art gallery owner
Eion Bailey as Josh Jacobs, Adrian's brother
Lucy Punch as The Clarinet
Vinnie Jones as Ray Barko
Zak Orth as Porter Canby
Michael Panes as Grant
Janet Carroll as Helen Finkelstein

Director
Jonathan Parker's debut film Bartleby (2001), an updated retelling of the classic Herman Melville tale "Bartleby, the Scrivener", was nominated for the Grand Prize at the Deauville Film Festival and was selected to be the opening night film of New York's New Directors/New Films Festival. A musician in his youth, Parker is also a collector of the San Francisco school of abstract expressionism, using many of his experiences in both worlds as a basis for (Untitled).

Reception

Reviews 
The film received generally mixed reviews from critics. The review aggregator Rotten Tomatoes reported that 65% of critics have given the film a positive review based on 40 reviews, with an average rating of 5.99/10. The site's critics consensus reads, "This satire on the art world is at times both clever and shallow, but its top-notch cast generates plenty of goodwill." On Metacritic, the film has a weighted average score of 58 out of 100 based on 19 critics, indicating "mixed or average reviews". Lisa Schwarzbaum of Entertainment Weekly wrote "The whole cast is museum quality, music and the performances are pitch-perfect in their dissonance. Gary Goldstein of Los Angeles Times called the film "Ace in the best movie satires, there's a solid core of truth Informing director Jonathan Parker's (Untitled), which takes on the New York art and music worlds smart and funny in one swoop." Stephen Holden of The New York Times wrote, "If (Untitled) shrewdly hedges its bets about the value of it all, it is ultimately on the side of experimental music and art and their champions, no matter how eccentric. For that alone this brave little movie deserves an audience." The film also received bad reviews like that of Kevin B. Lee Time Out New York in which he wrote "(Untitled) 's onslaught of self-indulgent bohos and art-vs.-commerce clichés are as ersatz as their objects of scorn."

Box office 
The film premiered in the United States on October 23. It opened in theaters and grossed in its first weekend $18,002.

References

External links
 Official Site
 
 

2009 films
2009 comedy films
American comedy films
Films about composers
Films set in Manhattan
Samuel Goldwyn Films films
2000s English-language films
2000s American films